Joseph Fay (6 August 1812, Cologne - 27 July 1875, Düsseldorf) was a German painter and illustrator; associated with the Düsseldorfer Malerschule.

Life and work 
From 1833 to 1844, he studied at the Kunstakademie Düsseldorf; initially with Karl Ferdinand Sohn. From 1841 to 1842, he attended the master classes taught by Friedrich Wilhelm von Schadow.

This fresco, executed in 1843, proved to be his artistic breakthrough and received praise from the poet, Wolfgang Müller von Königswinter. It was destroyed during World War II.

He went to Paris in 1844, where he studied history painting with Paul Delaroche. After returning to Düsseldorf, he produced no major works. In 1848, he became one of the co-founders of the progressive artists' association "Malkasten" (Paintbox).

After the revolution of 1848, he focused on simple genre scenes and works inspired by literature, including a melodramatic episode from Faust by Goethe. Many of his paintings featured Italian motifs, and he became a regular visitor to Italy. The background landscapes in his works were often painted by August Weber. He occasionally worked as an interior designer, and took a few private students; notably Karl Ferdinand Wimar.

Their son was the animal painter, .

Sources 
 
 Fay, Joseph. In: Friedrich von Boetticher: Malerwerke des neunzehnten Jahrhunderts. Beitrag zur Kunstgeschichte. Vol.I, Dresden 1895, pg. 288 f.
 Lisa Hackmann: "Fay (Fey), Joseph (Josef)" In: Bénédicte Savoy (Ed.): Pariser Lehrjahre. Ein Lexikon zur Ausbildung deutscher Maler in der französischen Hauptstadt. Vol.2: 1844–1870, De Gruyter, 2015

External links 

 Illustrations from Märchen und Sagen für Jung und Alt., Düsseldorf: Arnz & Co., 1857 @ the Universitäts- und Landesbibliothek Düsseldorf. (Vol.1), (Vol.2)
 "Joseph Fay, der Vergessene", biography @ Old Master Drawings

1813 births
1875 deaths
19th-century German painters
19th-century German male artists
German male painters
Artists from Cologne
Kunstakademie Düsseldorf alumni